Kusuga Komolong (born 23 June 1998) is a Papua New Guinean footballer who plays as a goalkeeper for University Inter. He made his debut for the national team on March 23, 2017 in their 2–1 loss against Tahiti. He has two older brothers, Alwin and Felix.

References

External links
 

Living people
1998 births
Association football goalkeepers
Papua New Guinea international footballers
Papua New Guinean people of German descent
Papua New Guinean footballers
People from Morobe Province